Abraham de Vries may refer to: 

 Abraham de Vries (painter) (c. 1590 – c. 1655), Dutch painter
 Abraham de Vries (minister) (1773–1862), Dutch minister and member of Teylers Eerste Genootschap
 Abraham H. de Vries (born 1937), South-African author